Phoenicobius is a genus of medium-sized, air-breathing land snails, terrestrial pulmonate gastropod mollusks in the family Bradybaenidae.

Species
 Phoenicobius adustus Sowerby, 1841 
 Phoenicobius aratus Sowerby, 1841 
 Phoenicobius brachydon Sowerby, 1841 
 Phoenicobius campanulus Pfeiffer, 1845 
 Phoenicobius oomorphus Sowerby, 1841

References

Bradybaenidae